Nueta Hidatsa Sahnish College is a public tribal land-grant community college in New Town, North Dakota.  It is chartered by the Three Affiliated Tribes of the Fort Berthold Reservation headquarters at New Town. The college has branches in Mandaree and White Shield.

History
The college was founded May 2, 1973, as the agency responsible for higher education on the Fort Berthold Reservation.  The Three Affiliated Tribes of the Fort Berthold Reservation in New Town, North Dakota endorsed the concept that a locally based higher education institution was needed to train Tribal members and to help retain the tribal cultures. The college was chartered by the Three Affiliated Tribes.

In 1994, the college was designated a land-grant college alongside 31 other tribal colleges.

Governance
Nueta Hidatsa Sahnish College is tribally controlled by a board of directors, which consist of seven members. A steering committee was appointed to oversee the initial operations of the college. This committee was replaced by the selection of a board of directors in 1974 who began plans to improve the educational and vocational services in the communities throughout the reservation.

Academics
The first classes offered at Nueta Hidatsa Sahnish College were on an extension basis with coordinating accredited institutions. The agreements were first made with University of Mary, Bismarck, ND; Minot State College, Minot, ND; and the University of North Dakota, Williston Center, Williston, ND. The college offers associate degree and certificate programs. As of 2011, it is one of seven tribal colleges in the U.S. to offer a degree related to tribal administration.

References

External links
Official website

Two-year colleges in the United States
Public universities and colleges in North Dakota
American Indian Higher Education Consortium
Educational institutions established in 1973
Buildings and structures in Mountrail County, North Dakota
Education in Mountrail County, North Dakota
1973 establishments in North Dakota
Mandan, Hidatsa, and Arikara Nation